Wesam Al-Sous (born February 24, 1983) is a retired Jordanian professional basketball player. He played for the ASU Club of the Jordanian Basketball League. He is currently serving as the head coach of the Jordan national basketball team.

Al-Sous competed with the Jordanian team at the FIBA Asia Championship 2007 and FIBA Asia Championship 2009. In 2009, Al-Sous helped the Jordanian team to a national best third-place finish by averaging 3.9 points per game off the bench for the team.

References

1983 births
Living people
Jordanian men's basketball players
Basketball players at the 2006 Asian Games
Point guards
Shooting guards
Basketball players at the 2014 Asian Games
2010 FIBA World Championship players
Asian Games competitors for Jordan